Cularo was the name of the Gallic city which evolved into modern Grenoble, until it was renamed Gratianopolis in 381 to honor Roman emperor Gratian.

The first remaining reference to Grenoble dates back to a July 43 BC letter by  Munatius Plancus to Cicero. The small town founded by the Allobroges Gallic people was at that time called Cularo. In 292, the western emperor Maximian elevated the town to the rank of “city” and built defensive walls around it. These Gallo-Roman walls both protected the urban area and marked its status of Civitas. The vestiges of the Gallo-Roman wall are now a landmark of this era.

Wishing to thank and honor the emperor Gratian for creating its bishopric, the inhabitants of Cularo renamed their town Gratianopolis in 381. That name would subsequently evolve into Grenoble through Graignovol.

The Saint-Laurent crypt and the Grenoble baptistery date back from the Gallo-Roman period (4th century) and have been preserved to this day; the latter remained in use until the 9th century but had since been buried under accumulated urban layers; it was rediscovered in 1989 during the construction of tramway tracks, excavated until 1996, and incorporated into the adjacent Musée de l'Ancien Évêché. Several small sections of the Gallo-Roman city wall are also visible in the old town, especially in rue Lafayette.

References

Further reading

External links 
 Perseus.

History of Grenoble
Allobroges
Archaeological sites in France
Roman towns and cities in France
Auvergne-Rhône-Alpes region articles needing translation from French Wikipedia